Allapalli is a village located in the Gadchiroli district of Maharashtra, India.

Geography
Allapalli is in southern Gadchiroli district, in a central part of Aheri tahsil. The village is situated along National Highway 353C, at an intersection with a road that traverses the district and connects Aheri and Etapalli. South and east of the village in the taluk are large areas of reserved forest.

Glory of Allapalli Biodiversity Heritage Site
Allapalli is known for its nearby old-growth forests, which were first noted as worthy of preservation by the British in 1867. More than 130 floral species have been observed at the site. Tree species include teak, tendu, dhawala, kusum, and yen trees, among others. Shrubs and herbs noted at the site include gunj, and tarota, gulwel, among others.

Climate

Demographics
As of the 2011 Census, Allapalli village had a population of 12,363 in 2,969 households, of which 6,251 were male, and 6,112 female. 1,301 were children between 0-6 years old. 5,321, or about 43% of the population, were Scheduled Castes and Scheduled Tribes.

Economy
The 2011 Census lists 4,148 workers and 8,215 non-workers in Allapalli.

Education
Schools in Allapalli provide pre-primary through senior secondary education. The 2011 census lists 9,368 of the total population as literate.

References

Villages in Gadchiroli district
Biodiversity Heritage Sites of India